Oakwood is an underground light rail transit (LRT) station under construction on Line 5 Eglinton, a new line that is part of the Toronto subway system. It will be located in the Little Jamaica neighbourhood at the intersection of Oakwood Avenue and Eglinton Avenue. It is scheduled to open in 2023.

Local member of Provincial Parliament Mike Colle organized a petition in 2012 that led to a station at Oakwood being added to the Crosstown plan. The main destination will be the Eglinton West commercial strip.

Description

The station will provide outdoor space to park 24 bicycles.

Oakwood station has an art installation by Nicolas Pye displayed on the main station entrance façade consisting of a photograph of colourful pick-up sticks on a white background. The work suggests the intersection of transit routes on a map as well as symbolizing cultural diversity in the neighbourhood.

Construction

The National Post reported that contractors who thought they were pumping grout into holes they had drilled had filled a sewer near Oakwood station with cement, shortly before Christmas 2013. The report quoted local business leader Nick Alampi, who said, due to Metrolinx attitude, his section of the Avenue "almost feels like it's the wild, wild west." The report asserted the accident increased local displeasure with the construction period. Locals had initially been mystified when sewage had backed up into their basements.

In March 2015, the east–west laneway south of Eglinton, near the station, was named Reggae Lane. Alampi credited the building of the station as a trigger to redeveloping the lane. The lane had once been the heart of Toronto's recording of Reggae music.

In June 2015, Metrolinx plans to expropriate a barbershop near the station triggered comment. The owners, Maureen and Ian Young, told CBC News that Metrolinx had failed to contact them, prior to announcing the expropriation in a local paper.

The secondary exit's location is the former site of a Popeyes fried chicken restaurant.

An overhead crane was assembled on the pile wall at the site of the station's main entrance. According to Metrolinx, this is the first time in Canada an overhead crane has been used over an open excavation. The site had no space to install a more typical tower crane or a luffing crane. It went into operation in mid-September 2017.

By September 2021, Oakwood station was nearing completion, with track laid and electrical overhead catenary installed. The station was built by "mining" (meaning its excavation was done entirely underground) rather than cut-and-cover. Mining activities began in October 2017. The mining excavation technique resulted in the finished station having a cylindrical shape.

Surface connections 

, the following are the proposed connecting routes that would serve this station when Line 5 Eglinton opens:

References

External links
Oakwood Station project page at the Eglinton Crosstown website.
 

Line 5 Eglinton stations